Morton (Jo Casters), Sherman (Herman Gillis) and Belluci (Roland Beelen) were among the founders of the New Beat musical trend that started in Belgium and expanded to elsewhere in Western Europe in and around 1987.  Combined, they released over 100 recordings under various names in less than a year during the peak of the movement.

Aliases 

 The Acid Kids
 The Airplane Crashers
 Balearic Beach
 Beat Professor
 Berliner Meisterschaft
 Boys & Girls At The University
 The Brotherhood Of Sleep
 The Brothers
 Bulgarka
 Chinese Ways
 The Crumbsuckers
 Danse Macabre
 Ei Mori
 Erotic Dissidents
 Explorers Of The Nile
 Freak Brothers
 Fruit Of Life
 The Hippies On LSD
 J.E.T.
 Kings Of Agreppo
 Mission Impossible
 The Moneymakers
 Mr. Horse
 New Beat Generation
 New Beat Sensation
 Opium Monks
 Probably The Best Band In The World
 Secrets Of China
 Super Nova
 Taste Of Sugar
 The Techno Bastards
 TNT Clan
 Trio Balkana
 The Vacuum Cleaners

The nickname "Morton-Sherman-Belucci" is allegedly a parody on the prolific 1980s Hi-NRG producer team of Stock, Aitken & Waterman.

External links

Belgian electronic music groups